Gading Serpong is a township, 21 km west of Jakarta at Kelapa Dua and Pagedangan, Tangerang Regency of Banten province in Indonesia. Total land area of this satellite city is about 1500 hectares, which was being first developed by  PT Summarecon Agung as Summarecon Serpong. In 1993, Keris Group in-cooperated with the development and the name was changed as Gading Serpong. Later Paramount Land also joined the project. To accelerate development in 2004, partners of the project decided to develop the Gading Serpong region individually, with a share of approximately equal shares. Now the township is mainly divided into two parts as Summarecon Serpong 
and Paramount Serpong.  The township already has schools, universities and colleges, modern markets, sports and recreation clubs, golf courses and clubs, hotels, convention centres, and hospitals.

Facilities

Multimedia Nusantara University
Summarecon Mall Serpong 
Big Ben International Centre for English, Music and the Arts
Christian School BPK Penabur Gading Serpong
Pahoa Integrated School
Tunas Bangsa Christian School
Salsa Food City
Sinpasa Modern Market
The Springs Club
Summarecon Car Exchange
Emerald Car Market
SMP Islam Al-Azhar 41 Summarecon Serpong
Scientia Convention Center
Garden Walk & Food Village
Scientia Square Park
Summarecon Digital Center
Gading Raya Padang Golf & Club
Partner 10 
Plaza Summarecon
St. Carolus Women And Children's Hospital 
Plaza Summarecon Serpong
Ibis Hotel
Atria - Hotel & Conference Center 
Paramount Residences Apartments 
Paramount Skyline Complex 
Bethsaida Hospital
Hotel Fame Serpong

Transport
Gading Serpong has direct access to Jakarta-Merak Toll Road and Jakarta Outer Ring Road. TransJakarta operates feeder bus routes from the township to different areas of Jakarta. Serpong railway station and the adjacent Rawa Buntu station of Jakarta Commuter Rail is located close to the township.

See also
Tangerang
Jabodetabek

References

Tangerang Regency
Post-independence architecture of Indonesia
Planned townships in Indonesia
Planned communities